Drăgotești may refer to several places in Romania:

 Drăgotești, Dolj, a commune in Dolj County
 Drăgotești, Gorj, a commune in Gorj County
 Drăgotești, a village in Prunișor Commune, Mehedinți County